Supreme Records UK was a record label affiliated to Peter Waterman Entertainment. The label released music from artists such as Lonnie Gordon, Mel and Kim and Princess. Most releases were then transferred to EMI.

Notable releases
1985: "Say I'm Your Number One" (#7 UK, #8 AUS, #2 New Zealand, #4 Switzerland, #6 The Netherlands, #2 Germany, #11 Ireland, #29 Austria, #22 US Dance, #19 US R&B)
1986: "Showing Out (Get Fresh at the Weekend)" (#3 UK, #12 AUS, #8 New Zealand, #1 Germany, #1 US Dance)
1987: "Respectable" (#1 UK, #2 Ireland, #1 AUS, #1 New Zealand, #1 Germany, #1 US Dance)

References

British record labels
Defunct record labels of the United Kingdom
Pop record labels